Geissospermum is a genus of flowering plants in the family Apocynaceae, first described as a genus in 1846. It is native to South America.

Species
 Geissospermum argenteum Woodson - Venezuela, the Guianas
 Geissospermum fuscum Markgr - S Venezuela, NW Brazil
 Geissospermum laeve (Vell.) Miers - N + E Brazil, the Guianas
 Geissospermum reticulatum A.H.Gentry - S Venezuela, Peru, N Bolivia
 Geissospermum sericeum Miers - Guyana, Suriname, French Guiana
 Geissospermum urceolatum A.H.Gentry -  NW Brazil

References

Apocynaceae genera
Rauvolfioideae